Salamon Ferenc (1825-1892) was a Hungarian historian, translator, and critic known for his writings on Ottoman Hungary.

Career
In 1854, Ferenc went to Pest (now Budapest) and worked as a journalist for various magazines.  In 1870, be was named Professor of Hungarian History at the University of Pest.

References

External links

People from Deva, Romania
Hungarian writers
19th-century Hungarian historians
Hungarian critics
Historians of Turkey
1825 births
1892 deaths